Mount Hagen Urban LLG is a local-level government (LLG) of Western Highlands Province, Papua New Guinea.

Wards
81. Kagamuga Urban
83. Mt. Hagen Town

References

Local-level governments of Western Highlands Province